Zuby Nehty are an all-female underground rock group from the Czech Republic.

History
The band was formed under the name Plyn in 1980 by Pavla Slabá (now Jonssonová), Hana Řepová, and Marka Míková. Plyn played concerts at the 007 Club Strahov, 011 Club Strahov, Euridika, and at alternative rock festivals. After being blacklisted in 1983, the trio changed their name to Dybbuk and added two members, Kateřina Jirčíková and Eva Trnková. They released their first EP, under the Rock Debut series on Panton Records, in 1987.

In 1986, Řepová, Jirčíková, and Trnková launched the side project Panika. A year later, Dybbuk fell apart and Jonssonová, Míková, and Naděžda Bilincová started Zuby nehty ("Tooth and Nail"). Tomáš Mika and Michal Pokorný joined on saxophones and Jan Lorenc on drums. Řepová rejoined the group in 1990. In 1991, they released the album Ale čert to vem under the name Dybbuk, and this was later re-issued as Poletíme in 1998.

The first Zuby nehty album, Utíkej (Run), came out in 1993, followed by Král vysílá své vojsko (The King Sends Out His Army) in 1995, Dítkám (For the Children) in 1997, and Loď odplouvá (The Ship Is Sailing Away) in 1999. The band produced a film and several videos for Czech television, theatre soundtracks, and a book of poetry for the underground publishing house Mata. 

In 2000, Zuby nehty stopped rehearsing and met occasionally to record soundtracks for Míková's theatrical productions. In 2003, Indies Records released the double CD Best of ... & Rarity. The group played on special occasions, e.g., the release of the digitalized film Hudba Praha 85 at Archa Theatre, various benefits, and festivals such as Mikulov and Unijazz events. In 2010, the decision was made to start rehearsing and playing concerts again. The band undertook a US tour in the fall of 2010, including a concert at the annual Czech street festival in New York City on October 2.

In 2014, they released the album Kusy (Pieces).

Zuby nehty has connections with the progressive rock group Už jsme doma: saxophonist Alice Flesarová was once a member of UJD, and UJD's frontman Miroslav Wanek produced some of their albums.

Band members

Current

 Pavla Jonssonová (was Slabá, née Fediuková) – guitar, vocals (1980–1998, 2010–present)
 Hanka Řepová (née Kubíčková) – drums, vocals (1980–1997, 2010–present)
 Marka Míková (née Horáková) – keyboards, vocals (1980–2000, 2010–present)
 Kateřina Jirčíková (née Nejepsová) – saxophone, flute, vocals (1983–1988, 1991–1997, 2010–present)

Plyn
 Pavla Slabá
 Marka Míková
 Hanka Řepová

Dybbuk
 Pavla Slabá
 Marka Míková
 Hanka Řepová
 Kateřina Jirčíková
 Eva Trnková

Other past members
 Renata Špičanová – saxophone (1980–1981)
 Dáša Seidlová – drums (1980–1981)
 Vendula Kašpárková – keyboards (1981–1983)
 Eva Trnková – guitar (1985–1988)
 Naděžda Bilincová – guitar (1988–1990)
 Tomáš Mika – saxophone (1988–1990)
 Michal Pokorný – saxophone (1988–1990)
 Jan Lorenc – drums (1988–1990)
 Michal Lang – drums (1988–1990)
 Alice Flesarová (née Kalousková) – saxophone, vocals (1991–1997)
 Klára Valentová – violin (1994–1997)
 Petr Svoboda – drums (1997)
 Jana Modráčková – drums (1997–2000)
 Martin Černý – bass (1998–2000)
 Jarda Svoboda – guitar (1998–2000)

Discography
Albums
 Ale čert to vem (under the name Dybbuk, 1991; re-issued as Poletíme in 1998)
 Utíkej (1993)
 Král vysílá své vojsko (1995)
 Dítkám (1997)
 Loď odplouvá (1999)
 Best of ... & Rarity (compilation; 2003)
 Kusy (2014)
 Srdce Ven (2021)

Compilation appearances
 Czech Alternative Music Vol. IV ("Ven paca" from Dítkám, 1998)
 Indies Records 2004 and Best of 15 Years ("Kobylka" from Král vysílá své vojsko, 2004)

Other
 Live 85 Volume 1 (under the name Plyn/Dybbuk, 1985)
 Rock Debut 1 (under the name Dybbuk, 1986)

References

External links
 
 Dybbuk at Česká televize

All-female bands
Czech rock music groups
Musical groups established in 1980
1980s establishments in Czechoslovakia